The Springboro Historic District in Springboro, Ohio is a  historic district that was listed on the National Register of Historic Places in 1999.

The Springboro Universalist Church or "Old Stone Church", at 300 South Main Street in the district, was built in 1905.  Its congregation disbanded in the 1950s.  The church building was in use by South Dayton Church of Christ in 2017.

References

Federal architecture in Ohio
Greek Revival architecture in Ohio
Warren County, Ohio
20th-century Unitarian Universalist church buildings
Historic districts on the National Register of Historic Places in Ohio